Phoboscincus is a small genus of skinks, lizards in the family Scincidae. There are two known species in the genus Phoboscincus. Both species are found on various island of New Caledonia.

Species
Phoboscincus bocourti  – terror skink
Phoboscincus garnieri  – Garnier's skink

The specific name, garnieri, is in honor of French mining engineer Jules Garnier.

References

Further reading
Greer AE (1974). "The genetic relationships of the scincid lizard genus Leiolopisma and its relatives". Australian J. Zool. Supplementary Series 22 (31): 1-67. (Phoboscincus, new genus).

 
Lizard genera
Taxa named by Allen Eddy Greer